Mrs Kaushik Ki Paanch Bahuein (eng: Mrs Kaushik's Five Daughters-In-law) was an Indian television series that aired on Zee TV, from June 20, 2011, to March 15, 2013.

Plot
The story revolves around an upper middle-class Rajasthani joint family called the Kaushiks living in Jaipur. Bindeshwari Kaushik runs a tight ship at home with her husband, their five sons, and the wives of four of them. Her youngest son, Karthik, is the apple of her eye and falls in love with the carefree Lovely.

Kartik's older brothers - Utkarsh and Bittu - run the family-owned ration shop while Shivendu and his wife Simran are police officers. Aditya works separately after returning from London. Utkarsh's wife Gehna is obedient and submissive who spends most of her time managing the kitchen. Bittu's wife Nimmi is clear-hearted and cheerful while Aditya's wife Ria is still learning Mrs. Kaushik's rules having come from London. Lovely and Karthik are married under special circumstances after Lovely's insistence on being with Karthik at all costs. While giving in, Mrs. Kaushik refuses to accept her as a daughter-in-law. After many obstacles and a period of living in a divided house, Lovely is finally able to impress Mrs. Kaushik and win her trust. During this process, Lovely pretends to be a maid called Dulaari serving her mother-in-law and sisters-in-law and after the charade is over, she single-handedly helps Aditya and Ria save their marriage after Ria suffers a miscarriage.

A newly united Kaushik family suffers a shock when Simran dies in the line of duty. Over time, the family overcomes the loss and Shivendu remarries. His new wife, Karantiya, had lived with the Kaushik family and underwent a change of heart before they were married.

The story revolves around the troubles and the love in the Kaushik family and how they overcome obstacles in their way.

Cast

Main lead 
 Ragini Nandwani/Vindhya Tiwari as Lovely Tyagi/Lovely Karthik Kaushik
 Mukul Harish as Karthik Kaushik (Guddu), Lovely's husband, Bindeshwari and Satyadev's youngest son

Main cast
 Vibha Chibber as Bindeshwari Satyadev Kaushik (Mrs. Kaushik/Maasa), Satyadev's wife, Utkarsh, Bittu, Shivendu, Aditya, Karthik and Radhe's mother 
 Rajeev Verma as Satyadev Kaushik (Mr. Kaushik), Bindeshwari's husband
 Gavie Chahal/Manoj Chandila as Shivendu Kaushik (Shibhu), Simran and Karantiya's husband, Bindeshwari and Satyadev's third son, Anu's father
 Rubina Shergill as ACP Simran Shivendu Kaushik, Shivendu's first wife, Anu's mother (deceased)
 Divjot Sabarwal as Karantiya Shivendu Kaushik, Shivendu's second wife, Anu's stepmother
 Jignesh Joshi as Utkarsh Kaushik (Munna), Gehna's husband, Bindeshwari and Satyadev's eldest son, Gudiya and Bubbly's father
 Gunn Kansara as Gehna Utkarsh Kaushik, Utkarsh's wife, Gudiya and Bubbly's mother
 Mohit Mattoo as Bittu Kaushik, Nimmi's husband, Bindeshwari and Satyadev's second son, Lucky's father
 Swati Bajpai as Nimmi Bittu Kaushik, Bittu's wife, Lucky's mother
 Alok Narula as Aditya Kaushik (Adi), Ria's husband, Bindeshwari and Satyadev's fourth son
 Deeya Chopra/Preet Kaur Madhan as Ria Aditya Kaushik, Aditya's wife

Recurring cast

 Sunita Shirole as  Bhagwati Devi Kaushik (Ammasa), Satyadev's mother
 Manoj Chandila as Radhe Kaushik, Komila's husband, Bindeshwari and Satyadev's youngest son (deceased)
 Priti Amin as Komila Bhalla/Komila Radhe Kaushik, Radhe's wife, Kiran and Brijbhushan's daughter
 Bharti Sharma as Aarti, Kaushik family's neighbour 
 Sanjay Batra as Subodh Tyagi, a famous politician, Lovely's father
 Utkarsha Naik as Mala Subodh Tyagi, a social worker, Lovely's mother
 Shiwani Chakraborty as Tanya Sharma, Lovely's friend
 Gaurav as Abhay, Lovely's friend, Tanya's husband
 Kanika Shivpuri as Daayi Maa, Tyagi family's caretaker 
 Ashiesh Roy as Mr Shukla (Shukla Ji), Lovely's former boss (2011-2012)
 Jyotsna Chandola as Anamika, Aarti's cousin, Shivendu's former fiancée (2012)
 Aashutosh Tiwari as Kundan Bansi, Anamika's boyfriend (2012)
 Guddi Maruti as Padmavati (Paddy), Bindeshwari's college friend, Madhav's wife, Honey and Baby's mother (2011-2012)
 Khushbu Thakkar as Honey, Padmavati and Madhav's elder daughter (2011-2012)
 Anurag Prapanna as Madhav (MD), Padmavati's husband, Honey and Baby's father (2011-2012)
 Menaka Lalwani as Baby, Padmavati and Madhav's younger daughter (2011-2012)
 Ruhanika Dhawan as Aashi, Pushpa and Akshay's daughter (2012)
 Rita Bhaduri as Naani, Pushpa's mother (2012)
 Navina Bole as Pushpa Dwivedi, Karthik's former girlfriend, Akshay's wife, Aashi's mother (2012)
 Sayantani Ghosh as Naina, an Icchadhaari Naagin or a female shape-shifting serpent (2012-2013)
 Gufi Paintal as Brijbhushan Bhalla, Komila's father (2012-2013)
 Gulfam Khan as Kiran Brijbhushan Bhalla, Komila's mother (2012-2013)
 Rakhi Vijan as Billo Rani Bhalla, Brijbhushan's sister (2012-2013)

Characters

Main characters

Supporting characters

Other characters

Extended cameo characters

Awards and nominations

References

External links

Indian television soap operas
Zee TV original programming
2011 Indian television series debuts
2013 Indian television series endings
Television shows set in Jaipur